Jack Anthony Turner (born 17 September 1992) is an English semi-professional footballer who plays as a goalkeeper for Southern League Premier Division South club Farnborough.

Career
Turner started his career in the youth team of Staines Town, but left in 2007 to sign for AFC Wimbledon. He made his senior debut for the Dons in the London Senior Cup on 7 October 2008, in a 0–3 defeat to Erith Town, conceding a hat-trick in four minutes. He signed his first professional contract in the summer of 2009, after rejecting offers to trial with clubs from the Football League. He made his league debut for AFC Wimbledon on 20 April 2010, in the Conference game against Tamworth, in a 0–1 defeat at Kingsmeadow. His next appearance in the league came over a year later in the 2010–11 season on 22 April 2011, in a 2–1 victory over Mansfield Town. He was an unused substitute in the 2011 Conference Play-off final win over Luton Town, which saw the Dons gain a place in the Football League. Turner made his professional debut on 4 October 2011, in a 2–2 draw with Stevenage in the Football League Trophy second round. After being released on a free transfer by AFC Wimbledon at the end of the 2011–12 season, Turner re-joined Staines Town.

Career statistics

References

1992 births
Living people
People from Ashford, Surrey
English footballers
Association football goalkeepers
Staines Town F.C. players
AFC Wimbledon players
Slough Town F.C. players
Cray Wanderers F.C. players
Farnborough F.C. players
National League (English football) players
English Football League players
Southern Football League players
Isthmian League players
Footballers from Surrey